IR-40 also known as Arak Nuclear Complex is an Iranian 40 megawatt (thermal) heavy water reactor near Arak, adjacent to the 1990s era Arak Heavy Water Production Plant.  Civil works for the construction began in October 2004. It was initially planned that the reactor would begin nuclear operations in 2014.

History

Iran's leadership decided to construct a natural uranium (i.e. not requiring enrichment to produce fuel) nuclear power plant, using heavy water as moderator and coolant, in the mid-1980s. The reactor design was 90% complete in 2002. By then the existing Tehran Research Reactor, after 35 years operation, was reaching its design safety limits, and had been enveloped by the suburbs of Tehran.

The reactor was originally going to be constructed at a location in Esfahan, but in 2002 it was decided to build instead at the current location near Arak. In August 2006, mixed reports came out about when the reactor would go into operation, one stating that the plant would start up in 2009, while another reported that operation would be postponed until 2011.  Reportedly, the Russian firm Nikiet assisted with portions of the design, but stopped in the late 1990s following U.S. pressure.

Press reports indicate that Iranian President Mahmoud Ahmadinejad visited the reactor in June 2013, on the occasion of the reactor vessel installation which is the final precursor prior to commencement of operation.

Current status
Under the Joint Comprehensive Plan of Action, Iran agreed to redesign the IR-40 reactor, with assistance from the P5+1, to minimize its plutonium production and avoid production of weapons-grade plutonium. Iran also agreed to remove the reactor core or calandria and fill it with concrete to render it unusable, and to export all spent fuel within one year of its removal from the reactor. On 14 January 2016, Iran stated that the core of the reactor had been removed and that it would be filled up with concrete. However, in a Channel 4 TV (Iran) interview on January 22, 2019, Ali Akbar Salehi, the head of the Atomic Energy Organization of Iran,  claimed that Iran had purchased spares to replace the core, and the pictures of the pouring of concrete into the reactor’s pit were photoshopped.

Role in Iran's nuclear program

Iran states that the reactor will only be used for research and development, medical and industrial isotope production. On June 16, 2010 Iran announced plans to fabricate fuel for the Tehran Research Reactor by September 2011 and to build a new 20 MW reactor for radioisotope production within five years.

Aspects of IR-40's design will also serve as a prototype and testbed for the larger 336 megawatt Darkhovin Nuclear Power Plant under construction near Ahvaz.

Proliferation concerns
There are some proliferation concerns about the reactor's ability to produce enough plutonium for several nuclear weapons each year. However the IAEA has reported that it found no indication of ongoing reprocessing activities, required to extract plutonium from the spent fuel.

Natural-uranium fueled heavy-water reactors were originally designed for producing weapons-grade plutonium usable for construction of nuclear weapons. Analysis suggests that Iran could extract 8–10 kilograms of high purity Pu-239 annually from fuel irradiated in IR-40. This, according to the IAEA, is sufficient weapons-grade material to produce 1 to 2 nuclear weapons annually. In August 2009 the IAEA was granted access to IR-40 and was able to carry out Design Information Verification, where the IAEA confirmed that the facility "at its current stage of construction conforms to the design information provided by Iran as of January 24, 2007."

As a result of concerns that this plutonium would support weapons development, former IAEA Deputy Director-General for Safeguards, Olli Heinonen, proposed a reactor redesign to a reactor using slightly enriched uranium fuel rather than natural uranium. Use of enriched uranium fuel combined with extended operations would reduce the reactor's ability to produce weapons-grade plutonium.

Iran has indicated they do not intend to reprocess IR-40 spent fuel to recover weapons-grade plutonium, nor operate under a low burnup regime that could produce weapons-grade plutonium. Originally a hot cell facility at the Arak site was planned, described as capable of handling irradiated fuel and targets (such as targets for production of medical radioisotopes) from the IR-40, but in 2004 plans for hot cells at Arak were removed. However some proliferation experts have expressed concern that once sufficient fuel has been irradiated Iran may modify this facility or build a separate reprocessing facility to recover weapons-grade plutonium.

Notes

References

External links

 President inaugurates Arak heavy water plant 
 Iran Nuclear Research Reactor (IR-40)
Videos
Arak Nuclear Complex  - Nuclear Threat Initiative (2014)

 

Nuclear program of Iran
Heavy water reactors
Arak, Iran
Companies based in Arak